Carl-Frederik Bévort (born 24 November 2003) is a Danish road and track cyclist, who currently rides ofr UCI Continental team . He was part of the team that won the team pursuit at the 2021 UEC European Track Championships.

Major results

Road
2020
 2nd Time trial, National Junior Championships
2021
 National Junior Championships
1st  Road race
1st  Time trial
 4th Time trial, UCI World Junior Championships
2022
 3rd Road race, National Under-23 Championships
 6th Time trial, UCI World Under-23 Championships

Track
2020
 2nd  Individual pursuit, UEC European Junior Championships
2021
 1st  Team pursuit, UEC European Championships
2022
 National Championships
1st  Individual pursuit
1st  Kilo
 3rd  Team pursuit, UCI World Championships
 3rd Team pursuit, UCI Nations Cup, Glasgow

References

External links
 

2003 births
Living people
Danish track cyclists
Danish male cyclists
Cyclists from Copenhagen
21st-century Danish people